The SPARS code is a three-position alphabetic classification system developed in the early 1980s by the Society of Professional Audio Recording Services (SPARS) for commercial compact disc releases to denote aspects of the sound recording and reproduction process, distinguishing between the use of analog equipment and digital equipment. The code's three positions refer to recording, mixing, and mastering respectively. The first two positions may be coded either "A" for analog or "D" for digital; the third position (mastering) is always "D" on digital CDs. The scheme was not originally intended to be limited to use on digital packaged media: it was also available for use in conjunction with analog releases such as vinyl or cassette (where the final character of course would always be "A"), but this was seldom done in practice.

The system was first implemented in 1984. Due to increasing complexity of recording and mixing processes developed over the code's first decade of use, SPARS decided to withdraw endorsement of the code in 1991 because they felt the code was overly simplistic and did not accurately reflect the complexity of typical recording and mixing processes in use at the time. However, many record labels continued to use the code and SPARS decided to re-endorse the SPARS code in 1995.

Codes

The three letters of the code have the following meanings:
First letter – the type of audio recorder (usually a tape recorder) used during initial recording (analog or digital)
Second letter – the type of audio recorder used during mixing (analog or digital)
Third letter – the type of mastering used (always digital for CD releases)

Eight possible variants of the code exist:
AAA – A fully analogue recording, from the original session to mastering. Since at least the mastering recorder must be digital to make a compact disc, this code is not applicable to CDs. While it was originally intended that the code could be used for analog releases, which would have the final letter "A", this virtually never occurred in practice. (RykoDisc apparently released some cassettes coded AAA.).
ADA – Analog tape recorder used during initial recording, digital tape recorder used for mixing/editing, analog mastering.
DAA – Digital tape recorder used during initial recording, analog tape recorder used for mixing/editing and mastering.
DDA – Digital tape recording used during initial recording, mixing/editing, analog mastering.
AAD – Analog tape recorder used during initial recording, mixing/editing, digital mastering.
ADD – Analog tape recorder used during initial recording, digital tape recorder used during mixing/editing and for mastering.
DAD – Digital tape recorder used during initial recording, analog tape recorder used during mixing/editing, digital mastering.
DDD – Digital tape recorder used during initial recording, mixing/editing and for mastering.

Since CD is a digital medium, it must be produced from a digital master—therefore the last letter of the code will always be D. Newer LPs stored the music in analog format, yet they were often labeled as DDD, as the recording and mixing/editing were both digital.

As digital tape recorders only became widely available in the late 1970s, almost all recordings prior to this date that appear on CD will be AAD or ADD, having been digitally remastered. This means that the original analog master tape has been converted (transcribed) to digital. It does not always imply that there has been any additional editing or mixing, although this may have taken place.

In practice DAD was very rare, as many companies (especially the well-known classical music labels) used digital tape recorders (which were not prohibitively more expensive than analog tape recorders) during the editing or mixing stage.

The jewel box booklet and/or inlay of early compact discs included the SPARS code, typically DDD, ADD, or AAD. The typeface Combi Symbols CD includes the two common ways that the code was written on recordings.

History
Chris Stone and other members of the Society of Professional Audio Recording Services (SPARS) proposed the code with a set of guidelines for CD manufacturers to mark their product with an indication of exactly which parts of the recording process were analog and which were digital.

The SPARS code was first introduced on commercial CD releases by PolyGram in 1984.

SPARS withdrew endorsement of the code in 1991 due to confusion over analog and digital conversions and interfaces; many felt the SPARS code oversimplified and meaningless. However, many labels continued to use it, and in 1995, the organization re-endorsed the code.

Limitations

Lack of detail
The main limitation of the code is that it only covers the type of tape recorder used, not taking into account other equipment used in the production of the recording. For example, during the mixing stage (the middle letter in the code) many DDD recordings may have actually been converted from digital to analog, mixed on an analog mixing console, but converted back to digital and digitally recorded, thus earning it a D in the relevant part of the code. In addition to this, many recordings have effects or parts of different recordings added on to them, creating more confusion for the code.

Representation of quality
Regardless of the quality of the recording, many DDD classical music compact discs typically sold for considerably more than their ADD counterparts of the same work, due to the so-called premium attached to the fledgling digital recording technology. For instance, Herbert von Karajan's and Berliner Philharmoniker's rendition of Beethoven's Symphony No. 3, an analogue recording from 1977 that won the Grand Prix du Disque, sold for considerably less than their 1984 digital recording of the same piece, though the newer recording was not particularly critically acclaimed.

Examples
These albums with common SPARS codes (AAD, ADD, DDD) are arranged by year of release on CD, where known:

Pre-1984 digital recordings
Many older recordings previously issued on vinyl were reissued on CD, beginning with the format's commercial introduction in late 1982 (see Digital recording for a timeline). Reissue CDs often only have the original LP's copyright dates on them, so it's not obvious when the CDs were actually made. If they bear a SPARS code, though, the manufacture date was no earlier than 1984. Most of these older recordings were analog, so it's not unusual to see AAD and ADD codes, but occasional examples of digital-recording codes appear on later CD editions, such as these:

Ry Cooder – Bop till You Drop (1979; first CD release 1983; date of CD release with SPARS code unknown) – DDD; first digitally-recorded album in the world.
Paul Davis – Cool Night (1981; first CD Release Feb. 1983; date of CD release with SPARS code 1983) – DDD; first album which was digitally recorded and mixed at Monarch Sound In Atlanta Georgia.
ABBA – The Visitors (1981; first CD release Oct. 1982; date of CD release with SPARS code unknown) – DDD; first commercial album pressed on Compact Disc, itself the first publicly available format for digital audio.
Peter Gabriel – Peter Gabriel (1982; first CD release 1983; date of first CD release with SPARS code 1988) – DDD (incorrectly printed as "AAD" on first release with SPARS code)
Donald Fagen – The Nightfly (1982; date of first CD release 1983; date of first CD release with SPARS code unknown) – DDD

Unusual codes
Different codes for different tracks
Celine Dion – Unison (1990) – AAD, DDD (four tracks)
Celine Dion – Celine Dion (1992) – DAD, AAD (four tracks)
Michael Jackson – Dangerous (1991) – DAD/AAD

A/DDD

 Mötley Crüe – Decade of Decadence 81-91 (1991) – The A/D for the first letter was probably written to reflect that the compilation had both songs that were recorded with analog tape and songs that were recorded digitally.

DD

DMP albums were recorded "Direct to Digital" (a digital equivalent of Direct-to-disc recording) with no mixing step. Notable among them are the albums of digital recording pioneers Flim & the BB's.
AAA
Aerosmith – Get a Grip (1993) – AAA (printed on CD releases despite CDs requiring a digital master)
David Bowie – Rykodisc'''s vinyl and cassette editions of his back catalogue bore AAA and/or ADA codes
The Thermals – Personal Life (2010) – AAA (printed on vinyl issue)
ADA
HB – The End of New Beginnings (Music Cassette) – Hell Breaks (2013) – ADA 
DAD
Simple Minds – Street Fighting Years (1989) – DAD
Erasure – The Innocents (1988) - DAD
Gin Blossoms – New Miserable Experience (1992, original issue) - DAD
They Might Be Giants – Flood (1990) – DAD
Ministry – Psalm 69 (1992) – DAD
Destiny in Space/Blue Planet/The Dream Is Alive – Original Motion Picture Soundtracks (Released together on one CD, 1994) – DAD
ABC – How to Be a...Zillionaire! (1985) – DAD
Pixies – Bossanova (1990) – DAD
D-A-D – Riskin' It All (1991) – DAD
DDDD
Wendy Carlos – Switched-On Bach 2000 (1992) – DDDD (The additional "D" was added to indicate the instruments the music was made on were digital; this may not be a SPARS-endorsed code.)
Haswell & Hecker – Blackest Ever Black (Electroacoustic UPIC Recordings) (2007) – DDDD
DDAD
Front 242 – 06:21:03:11 Up Evil and 05:22:09:12 Off (both 1993) – DDAD (The additional "D" was added to indicate the instruments the music was made on were digital. Ie, the music on the records were made on digital instruments and recorded digitally, but mixed using analog equipment)
DDA/DDD
Kenny Roberts – You're My Kind of People and It Only Makes Me Cry (Forgetting You)'' (1988; early 2000s CD releases) – DDA/DDD (Digital Recording And Mixing, but initially released only on analog formats.)

See also 
 Comparison of analog and digital recording
 Digital recording
 Sound recording and reproduction
 High Definition Compatible Digital

References

Compact disc